The ear-spot squirrel (Callosciurus adamsi) is a species of rodent in the family Sciuridae. It is endemic to Borneo (Indonesia and Malaysia) and is diurnal and active mainly in small trees. It closely resembles the plantain squirrel (Callosciurus notatus), but is smaller and with a distinct pale buffy patch behind each ear.

References

Thorington, R. W. Jr. and R. S. Hoffman. 2005. Family Sciuridae. pp. 754–818 in Mammal Species of the World a Taxonomic and Geographic Reference. D. E. Wilson and D. M. Reeder eds. Johns Hopkins University Press, Baltimore.

Callosciurus
Rodents of Indonesia
Rodents of Malaysia
Near threatened animals
Vulnerable fauna of Asia
Mammals described in 1921
Taxa named by C. Boden Kloss
Taxonomy articles created by Polbot